The 1900 Kilkenny Senior Hurling Championship was the 12th staging of the Kilkenny Senior Hurling Championship since its establishment by the Kilkenny County Board.

Mooncoin won the championship after a 5-09 to 1-15 defeat of Freshford in the final. This was their second championship title overall and their first in 12 championship seasons.

References

Kilkenny Senior Hurling Championship
Kilkenny Senior Hurling Championship